Wilson State Park is a public recreation area found on the south shore of  Wilson Lake reservoir approximately  north of the city of Wilson in Russell County, Kansas, United States. Located at the reservoir's eastern end, the state park covers  divided into two areas by the reservoir's southeastern arm: the Hell Creek area on the west side and the Otoe area on the east side. The Hell Creek area hosts a marina. Both areas include hiking trails, swimming beaches, boat ramps, and camping facilities.

See also
 List of Kansas state parks
 List of lakes, reservoirs, and dams in Kansas
 List of rivers of Kansas

References

External links

Wilson State Park Kansas Department of Wildlife, Parks and Tourism
Wilson State Park Brochure & Map Kansas Department of Wildlife, Parks and Tourism

State parks of Kansas
Protected areas established in 1966
Protected areas of Russell County, Kansas